Sir Douglas Osmond  (27 June 1914 – 20 April 2006) was the chief constable of Shropshire Constabulary and later Hampshire Constabulary.

Biography

Douglas Osmond was born in Bournemouth, the son of a schoolteacher mother and a father who was killed in action during the First World War. He was educated at local schools, and in 1932 won a Kitchener Scholarship to read Mathematics at University College London. 

He joined the Metropolitan Police in 1935, where he rose to Inspector, before joining the Royal Navy during the Second World War. After the war, he returned to the police and was appointed as the Chief Constable of Shropshire, (now part of West Mercia Constabulary), in 1946. At 32, he was one of the youngest to have achieved this position in the United Kingdom. (The youngest was Sir Eric St Johnston who, in 1940 at the age of 29, was appointed chief constable of Oxfordshire Constabulary). Equally remarkable was his rise through the ranks at a time when most chief constables were externally appointed.

In 1962, Osmond left to become the chief constable of Hampshire and Isle of Wight Constabulary, and in 1967 he presided over its amalgamation with the Portsmouth and Southampton city forces. At this point, the force was renamed Hampshire Constabulary and Osmond remained chief constable until his retirement from the post in 1977.

Death
Osmond died on 20 April 2006, aged 91.

Honours

During his life Osmond received the following honors:
1958: OBE
1962: Queen's Police Medal
1968: CBE
1971: Officer of the Most Venerable Order of the Hospital of St John of Jerusalem
1971: Knight Bachelor
1981: Deputy Lieutenant of Hampshire

See also
Hampshire Constabulary
Policing in the United Kingdom

References

Sources
Rolling, S. (2006). "Obituary - Douglas Osmond". Frontline (Hampshire Constabulary newspaper). June 2005. Portsmouth.
(2006). "Sir Douglas Osmond obituary". Daily Telegraph. 28 April 2006.

British Chief Constables
Knights Bachelor
Alumni of University College London
English recipients of the Queen's Police Medal
1914 births
2006 deaths
Metropolitan Police officers